St Bees Lighthouse is a lighthouse located on St Bees Head near the village of St Bees in Cumbria, England.

Earlier lighthouses
 
The first lighthouse on the site began its life in 1718 on land bought by Trinity House, one of the UK's general lighthouse authorities. It was constructed by Thomas Lutwi[d]ge, who paid a lease of £20 per year for the site. It stood 9 metres tall and was 5 metres in diameter topped with a large metal grate on which the lighthouse keeper would burn coal. To make money Lutwi[d]ge levied charges of 3½ pence per tonne of cargo carried by vessels to nearby ports.

In 1740 the Governors of St Bees School leased the lighthouse, with adjoining parcels of land. late in the tenure of Thomas Lutwidge, to Joseph Burrow of Whitehaven esquire for 5 guineas (£5, 5 shillings) at 1 shilling annual rent.

In 1822 it was the last coal-powered lighthouse in Britain, when it was destroyed by a fire in which the keeper's wife and five children perished by suffocation.

In 1866 this was in turn replaced by a new, higher round tower, built (along with two new dwelling houses for the keepers) further inland.

The current lighthouse
The foundation stone of the current tower was laid in a ceremony on 10 May 1865, with construction by builder John Glaister of Whitehaven.   Civil engineer Henry Norris supervised the construction as resident engineer on behalf of Trinity House.  Beneath the foundation stone a zinc box was laid containing a dated scroll signed by Henry Norris & John Glaister as well as by the others present at ceremony together with newspapers and coins of the realm.

It  was built of local sandstone topped by a lantern that was originally destined for Gibraltar It was provided with a large (first-order) catadioptric optic, supplied by Chance Brothers & Co., with a single lamp, supplied by Messrs. W. Wilkins & Co. of Long Acre. The optic included a 'dioptric mirror' (i.e. a set of double-reflecting prisms) which redirected light from the landward side of the lamp back out to sea.

The new lighthouse was still under construction in late November 1866 when Henry Norris was sued by a painter in court in Whitehaven who had not been paid for lettering a notice board at the lighthouse; but it was operational by the end of the year. By the 1890s it was displaying a group-occulting light, on the following pattern: visible for 24 seconds, eclipsed for 2 seconds, visible for 2 seconds, eclipsed for 2 seconds; the light could be seen up to  out to sea.

From 1913 an explosive fog signal was sounded from the lighthouse; it remained operational into the second half of the century. In the interwar period the lighthouse was used as a turning marker in the London to Isle of Man air races. During World War II the local Home Guard used it to practise defence/attack strategies although there is no record of ammunition being fired at it. The light was electrified in the mid-1950s. In the early 1960s a triple-frequency Tannoy electric fog signal was provided, in a detached building very close to the edge of the cliff.

At Whitehaven Archives there is the Register of Reports on Supernumerary Assistant Keepers between 9 June 1925 and 14 May 1976 listing every keeper at the Light between those dates- too numerous to list here. A Chronological and name index has been compiled and appended to the Archive Catalogue Record.
There is a list of keepers between 1841 and 1910 on GenUKI.

It was also de-manned and automated at this time: the light was then one of five to be remotely monitored from the Trinity House depot at Holyhead. In 1999 the light was further modernised (the lamp being replaced with a cluster of three 250W halogen lamps) after which it was monitored from the Trinity House Planning Centre in Harwich.

In February 2021 the (by then obsolescent) halogen lamps were removed and a new 90W LED light was installed (still within the original 1866 optic), which has succeeded in providing a more energy-efficient light source without any reduction in its range (18 Nautical Miles). It flashes twice every 20 seconds. The fog signal has been discontinued; it used to sound two blasts every 45 seconds.

See also

 List of lighthouses in England

References

External links

 Trinity House 
 Maritime Lights (Cumbria County Council)

Lighthouses in Cumbria
St Bees